Adam King Hodgins (1 November 1859 – 15 May 1932) was a Canadian businessman and politician. Hodgins was a Conservative member of the House of Commons of Canada. He was born in Lucan, Canada West and became an automobile dealer and farmer.

From 1908 to 1912, Hodgins served as a reeve of Biddulph Township, Ontario. In 1912, he was a warden for Middlesex County, Ontario.

He was first elected to Parliament at the Middlesex East riding in the 1925 general election and re-elected there in the 1926 election. After completing two terms in the House of Commons, Hodgins left federal politics and did not seek re-election in the 1930 vote.

References

External links
 

1859 births
1932 deaths
Canadian farmers
Conservative Party of Canada (1867–1942) MPs
Members of the House of Commons of Canada from Ontario
Mayors of places in Ontario